Democratic Convention (CD) was a political party in San Marino.

History
The party contested the 1998 elections in an alliance with the Sammarinese Democratic Progressive Party (PPDS) and Ideas in Motion. The alliance received 18.6% of the vote, winning 11 of the 60 seats in the Grand and General Council, becoming the third-largest faction.

References

Defunct political parties in San Marino